The Communauté de communes des 7 Vallées (also: 7 Vallées comm) is a communauté de communes, an intercommunal structure, in the Pas-de-Calais department, in the Hauts-de-France region, northern France. It was created in January 2014 by the merger of the former communautés de communes L'Hesdinois, Canche Ternoise and Val de Canche et d'Authie. Its area is 497.3 km2, and its population was 29,653 in 2018. Its seat is in Hesdin.

Composition
The communauté de communes consists of the following 69 communes:

Aix-en-Issart
Aubin-Saint-Vaast
Auchy-lès-Hesdin
Azincourt
Béalencourt
Beaurainville
Blangy-sur-Ternoise
Blingel
Boisjean
Boubers-lès-Hesmond
Bouin-Plumoison
Brévillers
Brimeux
Buire-le-Sec
Campagne-lès-Hesdin
Capelle-lès-Hesdin
Caumont
Cavron-Saint-Martin
Chériennes
Contes
Douriez
Éclimeux
Fillièvres
Fresnoy
Galametz
Gouy-Saint-André
Grigny
Guigny
Guisy
Hesdin
Hesmond
Huby-Saint-Leu
Incourt
Labroye
Lespinoy
La Loge
Loison-sur-Créquoise
Maintenay
Maisoncelle
Marant
Marconne
Marconnelle
Marenla
Maresquel-Ecquemicourt
Marles-sur-Canche
Mouriez
Neulette
Noyelles-lès-Humières
Offin
Le Parcq
Le Quesnoy-en-Artois
Raye-sur-Authie
Regnauville
Rollancourt
Roussent
Saint-Denœux
Sainte-Austreberthe
Saint-Georges
Saint-Rémy-au-Bois
Saulchoy
Sempy
Tortefontaine
Tramecourt
Vacqueriette-Erquières
Vieil-Hesdin
Wail
Wambercourt
Wamin
Willeman

References

Commune communities in France
Intercommunalities of Pas-de-Calais